Gardiner and Joseph (or Gardener and Joseph, or Gardner and Joseph) was launched at Hull in 1810. She made 11 voyages to Greenland or Davis Strait as a whaler in the northern whale fishery. She then traded briefly between Hull and North America. She foundered on 9 October 1824.

Career
She was a replacement for her owners's , launched at Hull in 1802 and lost in 1808.

Gardner & Joseph first appeared in Lloyd's Register (LR) for 1810 with Holberry, master, Eggingtons, owner, and trade Hull–Davis Strait.

The following data is from Coltish, supplemented by data from Lloyd's List (LL), LR, and the Register of Shipping (RS):

Fate
Gardner and Joseph ceased whaling. She was last listed in LR in 1824 with trade Hull–America and in the RS in 1825 with trade Hull–Quebec. 

Paragon, Simpson, master, rescued her crew. Gardner & Joseph was on a voyage from Hull to Saint John, New Brunswick.

Notes, citations, and references
Notes

Citations

References
 

1810 ships
Age of Sail merchant ships of England
Whaling ships
Maritime incidents in October 1824